Battle of Berlin is a 1973 West German documentary film directed by Franz Baake and Jost von Morr. It was nominated for an Academy Award for Best Documentary Feature.

References

External links

1973 films
West German films
1970s German-language films
German documentary films
German black-and-white films
Works about the Battle of Berlin
1973 documentary films
Documentary films about Berlin
1973 war films
1970s German films